Anti-Somali sentiment or Somalophobia  refers to the existence of fear and hostility against Somalis, or their culture.

Terminology
Anti-Somali sentiment is sometimes referred to by the countable sense Somaliphobe or the uncountable sense of Somaliphobia, or Somaliphobic sentiment. The antonym and opposite sentiment is referred to by the countable sense Somaliphile, or its uncountable equivalent of Somaliphilia.

Scope
The Aughties and early 2010s saw major sporadic outbreaks of violence against Somali shopkeepers in South Africa. This violence has been attributed to jealousy over the success of Somali businesses, and ethnic tensions. However, some writers have attributed such hostility to a wider xenophobia, since other non-South Africa Africans were targeted as well. Somaliphobia has also been reported in Kenya during their invasion into Jubbaland in 2011.

In the United States 
Somali Americans have experienced Anti-Somali sentiment and it is sometimes expressed in the context of anti-immigration sentiment. Anti-Somali sentiments sometimes overlap with Islamophobic sentiments and Racism in the United States.  

On Oct. 30, 2015, Asma Jama (a Muslim woman of Somali descent and Kenyan nationality) was beaten for speaking Swahili in an Applebee's in the outskirts of Minneapolis. The perpetrator for that violence was charged with third-degree assault. In June 2016, two Somalis were shot after wearing their traditional clothing. A week prior to the shooting, a Somali halal shop in the city was vandalized. Minneapolis City Council member Abdi Warsame discussed anti-Somali sentiments in the aftermath of the shooting of Justine Damond by a Somali police officer. In Dodge City, Kansas several Somali men were the victims of hate crimes ranging from racial slurs to serious bodily injury in 2016.  Due to the high concentration of Somali-Americans in Minnesota,  anti-immigration sentiment has been used as a campaign talking point, specifically by former President Donald Trump.

Abusiveness
There are also some pejorative terms that serve to dehumanize Somalis. The term skinnie became popularized with the film Black Hawk Down. The term has been said to allude to reducing Somalis to their humanitarian struggles and National Public Radio has suggested that its usage deprives Somalis of their own point of view. The term Abdi is also sometimes pejoratively used to refer to male Somalis. The Associated Press's stylebook suggested that Somali is the correct demonym or adjective rather than Somalian.

See also
Afrophobia
Anti-Arabism

References

Society of Somalia
Anti-national sentiment
 
Racism